Lounge-A-Palooza is a compilation album issued in 1997 by Hollywood Records. Released to capitalize on the 1990s lounge music revival, it features cover versions of songs, including classic lounge hits performed by contemporary artists and 1990s hits covered by lounge singers.

Critical reception
The album received mixed reviews, as various critics identified different tracks as standouts and disappointments. Salon said it made "a grand attempt to attract both trendies and true believers," and Weekly Wire said it was "all over the map." The A.V. Club called it "a pleasant surprise", while AllMusic said it was "a mixed bag," and Entertainment Weekly concluded it "avoids lounge's smarmy irony while retaining its sense of fun."

Track listing

See also
1997 in music

References

External links

1997 compilation albums
Lounge music albums
Hollywood Records compilation albums
Covers albums